The Davidson Wildcats women's basketball team is the basketball team that represents Davidson College in Davidson, North Carolina, in the NCAA Division I. The school's team currently competes in the Atlantic 10 Conference and are coached by Gayle Coats Fulks entering her first year.

History
Since beginning play in 1973, the Wildcats have an all-time record (as of the end of the 2015–16 season) of 415–525, with one regular season title in 2012 when they were in the Southern Conference. They have never made the NCAA tournament, but they have made appearances in the WNIT in 2007, 2012, 2013. In the latter year, they went to the Second Round for the first time ever after beating Old Dominion 82–73 before losing to Charlotte 72–60.

References

External links